Harper James Simon (born September 7, 1972) is an American singer-songwriter, guitarist, and producer. He is the son of Paul Simon and Peggy Harper. Simon's talents have appeared on several studio albums, and has been featured in films and television shows, including HBO's Girls. In 2010, Simon released his self-titled solo album, followed by his second album Division Street released in 2013.

Over the years, Simon has appeared as a musical guest on The Tonight Show with Jay Leno, Late Night with David Letterman, Jimmy Kimmel Live, and Late Night with Jimmy Fallon, and has been featured in Rolling Stone, Paper, Mojo, Uncut, Clash, The Independent, and London Times.

Simon is also a journalist, and has conducted interviews with cultural and political figures. He's contributed to several publications, including LA Review of Books, Purple, Issue, and Hesperios Journal. Simon is also a producer of film, music and charity events, and sits on the board of Waterkeeper Alliance.

Early life
Harper James Simon grew up in New York City as the eldest son of musician Paul Simon and his first wife, Peggy Harper. His stepmother was the late actress and writer Carrie Fisher. Simon made appearances in film and television shows growing up, including Sesame Street where he sang "Bingo" with his father in a segment that demonstrated how a record is made, as well as Lorne Michaels’ The New Show and Saturday Night Live in the 1980s. Many of Paul Simon's lyrics include references to the younger Simon, most notably "St. Judy's Comet", "Slip Slidin' Away" and "Graceland." His mother, Peggy, is the "silver girl" referred to in the song "Bridge Over Troubled Water." The feature film One Trick Pony is loosely based on the relationships between Paul, Peggy and Harper. After high school, Simon moved to Boston to study at the Berklee College of Music.

Early career
In the 1990s, Simon played the club circuit in New York as a solo artist with both acoustic and electric ensembles. He contributed music to two films by Abel Ferrara, New Rose Hotel and The Blackout, and played guitar on Carl Perkins's final album Go Cat Go!, recorded at Sun Studios in Memphis, Tennessee. He made cameo appearances in New Rose Hotel, as well as in Martin Scorsese's Bringing Out The Dead.

Simon has performed as a guitarist in Yoko Ono's Plastic Ono Band on many occasions, including headlining festivals such as ArthurFest in Los Angeles and All Tomorrow's Parties in the UK, both in 2005. He played guitar on Sean Lennon's album Friendly Fire, appeared in the film by the same name, and accompanied Lennon on the road opening for Regina Spektor and the Strokes.

Simon performed as part of Blackout Sabbath, a concert curated by Rufus Wainwright, alongside Beth Orton, Martha Wainwright, and Joan As Police Woman. He also performed as part of a Joe Boyd-produced tribute to Nick Drake that was broadcast on the BBC in 2013. Others on the bill included Stuart Murdoch from Belle and Sebastian, Blur's Graham Coxon, and Vashti Bunyan.

Solo albums
Simon's self-titled debut album was released in 2010. It was produced by Simon and veteran producer Bob Johnston, known for his work with Bob Dylan, Leonard Cohen, and Johnny Cash. The album featured many legendary session players, including members of the original "Nashville A-Team" Charlie McCoy and Hargus "Pig" Robbins, "Memphis Boys" Gene Chrisman and Mike Leech, and Lloyd Green, pedal steel player with George Jones and The Byrds. Other musicians on the album include Marc Ribot, Steve Nieve from Elvis Costello's Attractions, Yuka Honda from Cibo Matto, and Petra Haden. The debut featured songs co-written with Inara George and Booker Prize-winning novelist and poet Ben Okri.

In 2010, Simon performed as a musical guest on the Late Night with Jimmy Fallon, Jimmy Kimmel Live!, and Late Show with David Letterman. Simon played many festivals to support the release of his solo album, including Bonnaroo, SXSW, Port Elliot, Cambridge Folk Festival, and Festival au Désert in Mali (where he performed with Tinariwen), and opened for acts such as Kris Kristofferson, Marianne Faithfull, Fleet Foxes, and Brian Wilson.

Simon's second solo album, Division Street, was released on March 25, 2013 under Tulsi Records/PIAS. It was produced by Simon and Tom Rothrock, best known for his work with Elliott Smith and Beck. It features drummer Pete Thomas from Elvis Costello's Attractions, Nikolai Fraiture from The Strokes, Bright Eyes' Nate Walcott, and Wilco's Mikael Jorgensen, among others. Simon performed on The Tonight Show in support of Division Street.

Appearances 
In 2012, Simon reunited with the Plastic Ono Band, and was a featured guest at three Yoko Ono shows—at The Brooklyn Academy of Music, L.A.'s Orpheum Theater, and San Francisco's Fox Theater—where he shared the bill with Iggy Pop, RZA, Thurston Moore, Kim Gordon, Eric Clapton and Perry Farrell, among others.

Simon performed in the band Lavender Diamond for two shows at the Wiltern Theater in Los Angeles in 2013. Simon has regularly performed at the Los Angeles venue Largo, including two residencies at the venue, and has performed frequently with Largo regulars Jon Brion, Gillian Welch, David Rawlings, and Benmont Tench (Brion and Tench also appear on Division Street).

Simon has performed several times with various members of the Grateful Dead. In 2010, he performed with Bob Weir at the benefit for Rainforest Action Network. In 2012, Simon performed at the Jerry Garcia 70th birthday tribute along with Bob Weir, Cass McCombs, and members of Vampire Weekend. He shared the bill with the Grateful Dead's Phil Lesh at a benefit for Rainforest Action Network in 2013, and performed along with Weir, Lesh and others at the memorial for Grateful Dead lyricist John Barlow at the Fillmore Auditorium in 2018.

Simon has worked in collaboration with producer Hal Willner on two occasions. He performed for a two-week run in 2016 at the Adelaide Festival in Eric Mingus’ re-imagining of The Who's Tommy, which was produced by Willner, and performed in The Bells, a tribute to Lou Reed at the Lincoln Center in 2018, which was produced by Willner and Laurie Anderson.

Simon produced the 30th Anniversary of Repo Man along with Steve Hanft at The Regency Theater in Los Angeles in 2016. The event consisted of a film screening, and a concert musically directed by Simon featuring Fear's Lee Ving, Luna's Dean Wareham, and Harry Dean Stanton.

Simon also produced a benefit concert for the film non-profit Vidiots honoring Stanton the following year. The Harry Dean Stanton Award was held at The Theatre at the Ace Hotel in Los Angeles in 2017. Simon performed and acted as musical director alongside Karen O, Father John Misty, Inara George, John C. Reilly, Kris Kristofferson, and Harry Dean accompanied by Mariachi Los Reyes. The award was presented by director David Lynch.

In 2018, Simon performed at Bobby Kennedy Jr.'s Waterkeeper Alliance benefit as a duo with John C. Reilly, along with performances by Sarah Silverman, Kevin Nealon, and Larry David.

Simon has presented several films in Los Angeles in the past several years, and has conducted Q&A's and has served as a panel moderator for many of the screenings. He presented the unreleased cult film Nothing Lasts Forever and interviewed the director, original SNL writer Tom Schiller, at Cinefamily in 2014, and interviewed Buck Henry following the presentation of Miloš Forman’s Taking Off in 2016. He was the panel moderator at the screenings of Jimi Hendrix and Monterey Pop presented by Cinespia at the Hollywood Forever Cemetery in 2015. Simon also presented John Waters’ Female Trouble with Fred Armisen for American Cinematheque, and appeared in conversation with Armisen following the screening.

In 2017, Harper played guitar on Lady Gaga’s title track for her album Joanne, produced by Mark Ronson.

In 2018, he played Bram Stoker in an episode of Drunk History.

Journalism 
Simon has conducted many interviews for publications, as well as for Lip TV's Talk Show, which ran from 2016-2017. Some of his interview subjects include former CIA director James Woolsey, former senator Al Franken, actresses Natasha Lyonne and Anjelica Huston, directors Sean Baker and Sam Taylor-Johnson, artists Ed Moses and Alex Israel, Devo’s Mark Mothersbaugh, Pink Floyd’s David Gilmour, Monty Python's Eric Idle, and many others. He has interviewed artist Tracey Emin for Purple Magazine, and virtual reality pioneer and author Jaron Lanier for the L.A. Review of Books. Most recently, Simon interviewed director Miranda July for Hesperios Journal in 2019.

Personal life 
Harper Simon has been linked to actress Parker Posey.

Music in film and television
Songs from Simon's first album were featured in the Golden Globe-winning HBO show Girls, ABC shows Private Practice and The Neighbors, and in the film Peace, Love and Misunderstanding directed by Oscar-winner Bruce Beresford.

Film and television credits 
Girls (HBO)
Private Practice (ABC)
The Neighbors (ABC)
The Blackout (dir: Abel Ferrara)
New Rose Hotel (dir: Abel Ferrara)
Peace, Love and Misunderstanding (dir: Bruce Beresford)

Musical performances on television 
The Late Show with David Letterman
Late Night with Jimmy Fallon
Jimmy Kimmel Live!
Nick Drake Tribute (BBC)
Taratata (France)

Film and television cameos 

Sesame Street (1976)
One Trick Pony (dir: Robert M. Young) (1980)
The New Show (1984)
Saturday Night Live (1988)
New Rose Hotel (dir: Abel Ferrara) (1998)
Bringing Out the Dead (dir: Martin Scorsese) (1999)
Drunk History (2018)

Selected discography

Solo albums 

Harper Simon (2010)
Division Street (2013)

Other albums 

Carl Perkins, Go Cat Go! (1996)
The Blackout (Soundtrack) (1997)
Sean Lennon, Friendly Fire (2006)
Suphala, Blueprint (2006)
Song of America compilation (2007)
The Heavy Circles, The Heavy Circles (2008)
Daniel Merriwether, Love & War (2009)
Soko, I Thought I Was an Alien (2012)
Country Joe MacDonald, Time Flies By (2012)
Girls (Soundtrack) (2013)
Steve Nieve, ToGetHer (2013)
Lady Gaga, Joanne (2018)

References

External links
 Official website
 
 Harper Simon Interview

1972 births
21st-century American composers
Living people
American indie rock musicians
American male composers
American male guitarists
American people of Hungarian-Jewish descent
American rock guitarists
Berklee College of Music alumni
Paul Simon
PIAS Recordings artists